Lynne Read (born 1948) is an English former cricketer who played as a wicket-keeper and left-handed batter. She played for Young England in the 1973 Women's Cricket World Cup and later played one One Day International for the full England side against Australia in 1976. She took four catches, made three stumpings and scored 10 runs in her seven One Day Internationals. She played domestic cricket for East Anglia.

References

External links
 
 

1948 births
Date of birth missing (living people)
Living people
England women One Day International cricketers
Young England women cricketers
East Anglia women cricketers